Upminster is an interchange station serving the town of Upminster in the London Borough of Havering, Greater London. It is on the London, Tilbury and Southend line (LTSR),  down the line from London Fenchurch Street; it is the eastern terminus of the District line on the London Underground; and it is the eastern terminus of the Romford to Upminster Line on the London Overground network. Upminster is the easternmost station on the London Underground network as well as the easternmost National Rail station in London.

The station is managed by c2c, which operates the LTSR main line services. The station was opened in 1885 by the LTSR; its original entrance and structure beside the main line platforms survive from that date. A larger entrance and ticket hall on Station Road was built by the London, Midland and Scottish Railway in 1932 and has since been extensively modernised and includes a number of retail units. Today the station is owned by Network Rail. Upminster is located within Travelcard Zone 6.

History
The route to Southend was not direct, taking a considerable diversion in order to serve the docks at Tilbury. Between 1885 and 1888 a new direct route from Barking to Pitsea was constructed, with the station at Upminster opening on 1 May 1885. The next station to the east was East Horndon (now called ) and to the west was Hornchurch.

The Whitechapel and Bow Railway opened in 1902 and allowed through-services of the Metropolitan District Railway to operate on the LTSR line to Upminster. The District Railway converted to electric trains in 1905 and services were lost at Upminster when they were curtailed at East Ham due to the tracks between that station and Upminster not yet having been electrified. The LTSR was purchased by Midland Railway in 1912 and was amalgamated into the London, Midland and Scottish Railway (LMSR) from 1 January 1923.

The District Railway electric service extended eastward as far as Barking in 1908. Delayed by World War I, an additional pair of electrified tracks were extended by the LMSR and services of the District continued to Upminster in 1932. The District Railway was incorporated into London Transport in 1933, and became known as the District line. A new station at Upminster Bridge on the District line became the next station to the west in 1934. After nationalisation of the railways in 1948, management of Upminster station passed to British Railways.

Design

The station was greatly expanded in 1932 by the LMSR and the main station building, the two footbridges and the buildings on the remaining platforms were constructed in typical 1930s style. A further platform for services to Romford was a later addition. The primary station building, which gives access to the main Station Road, has been extensively redeveloped in contemporary style and includes three retail units. The original Victorian station structures remaining beside the main-line platform 1 have been refurbished and now include a secondary ticket office and waiting room with an exit to Station Approach and the car-park. The original platforms were linked by a subway which has since been abandoned. Step-free access is available to all platforms with the exception of platform 6, for the Romford branch line.

The station is the location of a London Underground signal box at the eastern end of the platforms and, several hundred yards further east, the modern signal control centre for all main-line operations on the LTSR. Further beyond the station to the east is Upminster Depot, one of the main railway depots for the District line.

Services

Platform 1A, a bay platform, is only used during engineering works that cause c2c to operate a shuttle between Upminster & Grays. It is only accessible by trains arriving from the branch and leaving to the branch.
Platform 1 for services to Fenchurch Street and Liverpool Street.
Platform 2 for Grays, Southend and Shoeburyness.
Platforms 3, 4 and 5 are served by the District line.
Platform 6 is used for shuttle service to/from Romford, operated by London Overground.

The typical off-peak service of trains per hour (tph) is:
c2c, main-line:
4tph to London Fenchurch Street;
2tph to Shoeburyness via Basildon;
2tph to Southend Central via Ockendon.
London Overground, Romford to Upminster Line:
2tph to Romford.
London Underground, District line:
6tph to Richmond; (7tph at peak times)
6tph to Ealing Broadway.

Connections
London Buses routes 248, 346, 347, 370 and school routes 646, 648 and 652 serve the station.

References

External links

c2c information for Upminster station

District line stations
Railway stations in the London Borough of Havering
DfT Category C2 stations
Tube stations in the London Borough of Havering
Former London, Tilbury and Southend Railway stations
Railway stations in Great Britain opened in 1885
Railway stations served by c2c
Railway stations served by London Overground